Leptophyes is a genus of bush-crickets (family Tettigoniidae) found in Africa, Asia, and Europe. The genus was erected by Franz Xaver Fieber in 1853.

Description
In these bush-crickets the antennae are up to four times as long as the body. The legs are quite long. The tibiae are twice as long as the pronotum.

Distribution
Species within this genus are present in Europe, Asia Minor, Palestine, Ethiopia and Kashmir.

Species
Species within this genus include:

 Leptophyes albovittata (Kollar, 1833)
 Leptophyes angusticauda Brunner von Wattenwyl, 1891
 Leptophyes bolivari Kirby, 1906
 Leptophyes boscii Fieber, 1853
 Leptophyes calabra Kleukers, Odé & Fontana, 2010
 Leptophyes discoidalis (Frivaldsky, 1867)
 Leptophyes festae Giglio-Tos, 1893
 Leptophyes helleri Sevgili, 2004
 Leptophyes intermedia Ingrisch & Pavicevic, 2010
 Leptophyes iranica (Ramme, 1939)
 Leptophyes karanae Naskrecki & Ünal, 1995
 Leptophyes laticauda (Frivaldsky, 1867)
 Leptophyes lisae Heller, 1988
 Leptophyes nigrovittata Uvarov, 1921
 Leptophyes peneri Harz, 1970
 Leptophyes punctatissima (Bosc, 1792)
 Leptophyes purpureopunctatus Garai, 2002
 Leptophyes sicula Kleukers, Odé & Fontana, 2010
 Leptophyes trivittata Bei-Bienko, 1950

References

 Kurt Harz: Die Orthopteren Europas. Band 1, Dr. W. Junk N. V., Den Haag 1969.

External links
 

Phaneropterinae
Orthoptera of Africa
Orthoptera of Asia
Orthoptera of Europe
Taxa named by Franz Xaver Fieber